Anangsha Biswas Is an Indian actress known for her roles in Bollywood and web series such as Mirzapur on Amazon Prime, Hostages on Hotstar, Pratibimb on YouTube, Ascharyachakit on Netflix.

Theatre background
Anangsha Biswas performed theatre with Naseeruddin Shah, Benjamin Gilani, Farid Currim, Shefali Shah, Akash Khurana etc. in Mumbai. She later went to Sydney to study acting from Tafta.

Career
Anangsha made her screen debut with a small role as a child actress in Sudhir Mishra's Khoya Khoya Chand. She then played a role in Luv Shuv Tey Chicken Khurana and later she came into limelight with her role in an Amazon Prime web series Mirzapur.

Filmography

Films

Television

Webseries

References

Living people
21st-century Indian actresses
Indian entertainers
Indian female models
Indian film actresses
1990 births